KSVN (730 AM) is a radio station broadcasting a Regional Mexican format. Licensed to Ogden, Utah, United States, it serves the Ogden and Salt Lake City area.  The station is currently owned by Azteca Broadcasting Corporation.

History
KSVN began broadcasting as an English-language station, KOPP, on September 28, 1947. Before its sign on, the station was assigned the call letters KSLO (which were withdrawn following objections from KLO and KSL) and KLWT; the KOPP call sign was assigned on June 13, 1947. The call letters were changed to KKOG on April 9, 1956, and KSVN on November 29, 1959.

In the 1960s, KSVN was known as "K-7 Radio", also known as "K-730 Radio", and was owned by the same group that owned KSXX "K-630" in Salt Lake City. The two stations were sister top 40 stations before KCPX (1320) became a top 40 powerhouse in the mid-1960s (KSXX changed to a talk format station in 1965, and later changed call letters to KTKK). In 1989, KSVN began broadcasting in Spanish.

References

External links

FCC History Cards for KSVN 

Mass media in Salt Lake City
SVN
Radio stations established in 1947
Regional Mexican radio stations in the United States
1947 establishments in Utah